Joseph Signay, (8 November 1778 – 3 October 1850), was the third archbishop of the Roman Catholic Archdiocese of Quebec.

Signay was ordained in 1802 by Bishop Pierre Denaut and began a number of years of parish duties. In 1814, he was appointed parish priest of Quebec by  Archbishop Joseph-Octave Plessis. In 1825, Bernard-Claude Panet became archbishop and selected Signay as his coadjutor.

Signay became archbishop in 1833 and he was followed by Pierre-Flavien Turgeon in 1850.

External links

 Biography at the Dictionary of Canadian Biography Online
 

Roman Catholic archbishops of Quebec
1778 births
1850 deaths
19th-century Roman Catholic archbishops in Canada
Burials at the Cathedral-Basilica of Notre-Dame de Québec